Crioceris hampsoni, is a species of leaf beetle found in India, and Sri Lanka.

Description
Body yellowish with a length of 4.5 mm. Head and antennae are pitch black. Elytra dull brick-red in color. There are three black spots on each elytron. Antennae short and robust. Thorax broader than long, with sub-cylindrical anterior portion. Pronotal disc is brick-red. Scutellum also brick-red, with piceous marginal lines. Elytra sub-cylindrical. Legs are brick-red.

References 

Criocerinae
Insects of Sri Lanka
Beetles described in 1908